Lacuna Island is a small island lying  east of Tula Point, the northern end of Renaud Island, in the Biscoe Islands, Antarctica. It was mapped from air photos obtained by Hunting Aerosurveys Ltd, 1956–57, and was so named by the UK Antarctic Place-Names Committee because the island lies in a lacuna (a gap) in the vertical air photos.

See also 
 List of Antarctic and sub-Antarctic islands

References

Islands of the Biscoe Islands